The Samsung Galaxy M53 5G is a mid-range Android smartphone developed by Samsung Electronics as a part of its Galaxy M series. This phone was announced on 7 April 2022. Its key features are MediaTek's SoC Dimensity 900 5G, 120 Hz Super AMOLED Plus display, a triple camera setup with a 108 MP main camera and a 5000 mAh battery with 25W fast charging support.

Specifications

Hardware 
Samsung Galaxy M53 5G is powered by MediaTek Dimensity 900 5G SoC with 6 nm process, an integrated 5G modem, an octa-core CPU comprising a high performance cluster with 2x 2.4 GHz Cortex-A78 Gold cores and a power efficiency cluster with 6x 2.0 GHz Cortex-A55 Silver cores and Mali-G68 MC4 GPU. It has a 6.7 inch (172 mm) Super AMOLED Plus display with 1080x2400 pixels resolution, 20:9 aspect ratio, ~393 ppi pixel density, 120 Hz refresh rate and 16M colors. It features a triple camera setup at the rear with a 108 MP main camera with f/1.8 aperture, an 8 MP ultrawide-angle camera with f/2.2 aperture, a 2 MP macro camera with f/2.4 aperture, and a 2 MP depth camera with f/2.4 aperture. There is a 32 MP front-facing camera with f/2.2 aperture located in the circular punch hole of the display. It supports 4K video recording from the main camera and the front facing camera. It has a 5000 mAh non-removable battery with 25W fast charging support. However, there isn't a 25W charger in the box and it needs to be bought separately. It comes with 6/8 GB RAM and 128 / 256 GB internal storage and supports memory expansion via the hybrid SIM/microSD card slot up to 1 TB.

Software 
Samsung Galaxy M53 5G is shipped with Android 12 and Samsung's proprietary user interface One UI 4.1. It comes with Knox Security Suite and AltZMode.

References 

Android (operating system) devices
Samsung mobile phones
Phablets
Mobile phones introduced in 2022
Samsung Galaxy
Mobile phones with multiple rear cameras